Toro may refer to:

Places
Toro, Molise, a comune in the Province of Campobasso, Italy
Toro, Nigeria, a Local Government Area of Bauchi State, Nigeria
Toro, Shizuoka, an archaeological site in Shizuoka Prefecture, Japan
Toro, Zamora, a municipio in the Province of Zamora, Castille and León, Spain
Toro District, one of eleven districts of the province La Unión in Peru
Tooro Kingdom, a traditional kingdom in Uganda
Toro sub-region, a region that is coterminous with the Toro Kingdom in Western Uganda
Shakhtyorsk, a town in Sakhalin Oblast, Russia, known as Toro in Japanese
1685 Toro, an asteroid

Companies
Toro (company), an American manufacturer of lawnmowers and other lawn equipment
Toro (food), a Norwegian food company

People
Abraham Toro (born 1996), Canadian baseball player
Janet Toro (born 1963), Chilean performance artist
Julio Toro (born 1952), Puerto Rican basketball coach
Manuel Murillo Toro (1816–1880), Colombian politician and statesman, twice President of the United States of Colombia
Ray Toro (born 1977), lead guitarist for the band My Chemical Romance
Benicio del Toro (born 1967), Puerto Rican-American actor
Guillermo del Toro (born 1964), Mexican film director
Alfredo Toro Hardy (born 1950), Venezuelan diplomat and author
Toró (born 1986), nickname of Brazilian footballer Rafael Ferreira Francisco
Toro people, an ethnic group in western Uganda, native to Toro Kingdom

Characters
Toro Inoue, the mascot for Sony Computer Entertainment
Toro (mascot), a mascot for the National Football League's Houston Texans franchise
Toro (comics), a Marvel Comics character 
Gim Toro, an Italian comics character
 Toro, a male Carnotaurus from the Netflix show Jurassic World Camp Cretaceous

Animals
Toro (rodent), a spiny rat in the genus Isothrix
A name for some species of fish bigeye family
Priacanthus arenatus, the Atlantic bigeye
Pristigenys alta, the short bigeye

Other uses
Il Toro, or Torino F.C., an Italian football team
Toro, a Spanish Fighting Bull used in bullfighting
Toro, three turns on the track at Cesana Pariol for the 2006 Winter Olympics
Toro (film), a 2015 film
, a Spanish film
Tōrō, a Japanese traditional lantern, originally from China
Toro (tree), or Rapanea salicina, a New Zealand native tree
Toro (DO), a Denominación de Origen for wine in Spain
Toro (magazine), a Canadian men's magazine 
Toro (sushi), fatty tuna used in sushi
T'uru, also spelled Toro, a mountain in Peru
Toro, the codename for the Verizon Wireless version of the Galaxy Nexus
Oldsmobile Toronado, an automobile that was manufactured by the Oldsmobile division of General Motors
 Toro Bravo, a type of cow also known as the Spanish fighting bull
 TORO (Torque Controlled Humanoid Robot), a development of Justin (robot) by DLR

See also
El Toro (disambiguation)
Doro (disambiguation)